Chorosoma is a genus of true bugs belonging to the family Rhopalidae.

The genus was first described by Curtis in 1830.

The species of this genus are found in Europe and Western Asia.

Species:
 Chorosoma schillingii (Schilling, 1829)

References

Rhopalidae